Châtin is a commune in the Nièvre department in central France.

Demographics
On 1 January 2019, the estimated population was 84.

Notable people
Châtin was the birthplace of Annick Gendron, painter.

See also
Communes of the Nièvre department
Parc naturel régional du Morvan

References

Communes of Nièvre